Fageia is a genus of running crab spiders that was first described by Cândido Firmino de Mello-Leitão in 1929.

Species
 it contains six species, found only in Brazil and Argentina:
Fageia amabilis Mello-Leitão, 1929 (type) – Brazil
Fageia clara Mello-Leitão, 1937 – Brazil
Fageia concolor Mello-Leitão, 1947 – Brazil
Fageia meridionalis Mello-Leitão, 1943 – Brazil
Fageia moschata Mello-Leitão, 1943 – Brazil
Fageia rosea Mello-Leitão, 1944 – Argentina

See also
 List of Philodromidae species

References

Araneomorphae genera
Philodromidae
Spiders of Brazil
Taxa named by Cândido Firmino de Mello-Leitão